Kampong Kapor Methodist Church (Abbreviation: KKMC) is located on Kampong Kapor Road in Singapore's Little India district. The church is approximately 300 metres from Jalan Besar MRT station.

Founded in 1894, KKMC is one of the first Peranakan churches and the fourth Methodist church to be established in Singapore. During its early years, the church catered to the Peranakan or Straits-born Chinese, with services conducted in Baba Malay in a building located on 155 Middle Road. In 1930, the church moved to its present site on 1 Kampong Kapor Road, where it now offers a variety of services to different ethnic groups.

The church building on Kampong Kapor Road was given conservation status by Singapore’s Urban Redevelopment Authority in 1989; its earlier building on 155 Middle Road was awarded historic site status in 2000. The church celebrated its hundredth anniversary in January 1994.

History
Founded as a church in 1894, Kampong Kapor Methodist Church began its activities in November 1890, in the lower room of the Deaconess Home. Upon request, Miss Sophia Blackmore, a missionary to Singapore (and also the founder of the Fairfield Methodist Schools and the Methodist Girls' School)  started a Sunday Malay language worship service. The group comprised 25 “native” girls from the mission hostel, boys from Epworth Home (precursor of the Methodist Youth Fellowship), Malay-speaking Christian workers from the nearby Mission Press  and two missionaries.

On 25 January 1894, this group moved to “The Christian Institute” located on 155 Middle Road to function as a church. At 7.30pm that evening, six full and 16 preparatory members were organised as the first Malay Quarterly Conference chaired by the presiding elder, Rev. R.W. Munson. The “Malay Church” was formed with Cpt. Rev. William Shellabear undertaking pastoral charge. Three days later, the Sunday school was officially organised with about 40 students. “Sunday” school was also carried out on weekdays as well.

Rev. Shellabear and about a dozen young men held street and kampong meetings in Malay. Meanwhile, Miss Blackmore and her team of women as well as the women missionaries made a deep impression on Nyonya women and their children as they distributed tracts, sang hymns, visited several hundred “native” Straits-born Chinese women in their homes and held Sunday School for “native” children in their homes and along five-foot ways.

The church soon outgrew its Middle Road premises and a new building was constructed on Kampong Kapor Road. It was completed in 1930  and the church became known as The Straits Chinese Methodist Church (Bishop Bickley Memorial). This reflected the largely Chinese membership and the vast donations which the family and friends of Bishop George Harvey Bickley made for the construction of the building.

In 1957, the Board of Stewards decided that since the church not only catered to the spiritual needs of the Straits-born Chinese but also to the other ethnic groups as well, the church should be known as Kampong Kapor Methodist Church (Bishop Bickley Memorial). It has retained this name ever since.

Buildings
The building which was once occupied by the church on 155 Middle Road still exists to this day. It now houses Objectifs — the Centre for Photography and Films.

The present church building dates from 1929, and was designed by Swan and Maclaren, the oldest architectural firm in Singapore. Over the years, the church has undergone major renovation and rebuilding works to cater to the growing congregation without affecting the main features of the church. The church was recently renovated in 2000, when emergency structural works were necessary, as the construction of the nearby North East MRT Line caused the foundations of the building to shift, causing large cracks to appear on the walls of the sanctuary. The foundations of the sanctuary were underpinned, and the church also took the opportunity to renovate the education block, reconfiguring parts of it to create a new chapel and classrooms on the third floor. While the church was closed, worship services were held at the Anglo-Chinese Primary School, Ah Hood Road (which was also at a temporary location, as the school's Barker Road campus was being rebuilt).

The present building is in a stripped-back Art Deco, incorporating elements from the earlier styles of Gothic architecture, which is clearly seen in the spire of the bell tower, as well as the finials that occur on all the original façades and tower. The ornamentation is simple but delicate, and is derived from the shape of the cross, with the finials, tower windows and exterior walls' ornament all derived from it. This motif continues inside. The interior of the sanctuary is simple and elegant, with dark wooden trusses springing gracefully from cross-shaped brackets on the walls between round clerestory windows. At the apex of the roof, a further clerestory window admits more daylight. Originally a single nave with side aisles, the sanctuary is now L-shaped, incorporating a hall which was originally screened off by doors. The design of the pews is based on the original rattan-backed pews which they replaced.

The altar and pulpit were originally in an apse at the end of the church, surrounded by wood paneling on the walls, with a cross-shaped window above it and flanked by two arched windows, but this is now occupied by the pipe organ which was introduced in 1936. Earlier designs for the church included a gallery and an enclosed organ chamber, but these were not included in the final design. The interior has undergone several renovations, including (a rather unsuccessful) one in the 1960s, when the entire apse was screened off by a plasterboard wall. The changes from that renovation have all been since undone. The altar, ambo and font are now on a dais just in front of it, surrounded by a communion rail. The tower is eighty-eight feet tall, and contains four bells cast in the Royal Eijsbouts bell foundry, which are hung dead for stationary chiming.

The street-facing façade of the sanctuary building originally had three portals: one at each aisle, and a central portal with a large porte cochère, but none of these remain. It is unclear why the original porte-cochère was demolished, but it is thought to be because the government intended to widen the road. In its place, the window over the central entrance has been enlarged and now contains stained glass, and the sanctuary is now access via the main entrance of the education block. The road widening clearly did not require the demolition of the porte cochère, as the strip of land in front of the church was subsequently returned, unused, in the 2000s, but there are no plans to re-instate the original entrances. This strip is now enclosed by a fence, which the Church built in order to enclose the newly returned piece of land.

KKMC also owns a three-storey shophouse next to the church which is called The Unfailing Light. The place is used for the church's Youth, Seniors Ministries as well as the Homework Centre. Occasionally, it is also used for special sermons and courses.

Pipe Organ
The church is home to one of the few working pipe organs in Singapore,
and is the only Methodist Church in Singapore to have one. The organ was the gift of the Ladies’ Aid Society. It was built by Walker & Taylor, Lincoln, England, in 1936 and installed in the church in 1937. The façade bears a strong resemblance to the organ in the chapel at Orchard Road Presbyterian Church. The organ originally had tracker action and mechanical stop and coupler controls. In 1987, when the Education Block was constructed and the sanctuary was renovated, the organ was completely dismantled and stored in a warehouse. After the renovation, it was rebuilt and raised to its present height. A new console replaced the original, and the swell box was removed to accommodate more ranks. The action was also electrified to accommodate the enlargements to the organ. However, the organ's original slider wind chests were retained. In 1995, platforms were included on both sides of the organ to allow for more pipes to be added.

The new ranks of pipes that have been added over the years include the Great Mixture, mutations in the Swell, the reed stops (Trumpet 8' and Clarion 4') and the Subbass 16' in the Pedal. The organ continues to be integral with the music of the church, and is played during the Sunday morning services. Robert Navaratnam, at one time Singapore's only organ builder, has been responsible for the renovations, maintenance and tuning of the organ.

Organ Specification

Great
Principal 8'
Dulciana 8'
Clarabel 8'
Flute 8'
Principal 4'
Piccolo 2'
Flute 4' 
Mixture 1 1/3' 
Trumpet 8' 
Glockenspiel (drawn by Pedal Flute 4 stop)

Swell
Diapason 8' 
Gedackt Flute 8' 
Harmonic Flute 4' 
Octave 4'
Nazard 2 2/3' 
Terz 1 3/5' 
Fifteenth 2'
Trumpet 8'
Harmonic Clairon 4'

Pedal
Bourdon 16'
Subbass 16'
Gedackt 8' 
Trumpet 8' 
Trumpet 4' 
Flute 4' (prepared)

Services
There are four services held each Sunday at Kampong Kapor Methodist Church. Two services are conducted in English at 8am and 10am with Holy Communion celebrated once a month. The 10am service is live-streamed.

The Mandarin and Tamil services are held at 2pm and 5.30pm respectively.The services are also live-streamed.

Services in Peranakan are at 11am on the 1st and 3rd Sunday of each month at the 3rd floor Chapel.

A Myanmar Fellowship meets at 1pm on the 3rd Sunday of each month, also at the 3rd floor Chapel.

The Children Sunday School is held at 9.45am every week except for the 1st Sunday each month for infants to 12-year old. The youths meet every week except for the 1st Sunday of each month at The Unfailing Light building next to the church at 9.30am.

References

Further reading

News articles

External links
Official website of Kampong Kapor Methodist Church
Official website of the Methodist Church in Singapore

Singapore
20th-century Methodist church buildings
Methodist churches in Singapore
Churches completed in 1929
Rochor
20th-century architecture in Singapore